The 2006 Tunbridge Wells Borough Council election took place on 4 May 2006 to elect members of Tunbridge Wells Borough Council in Kent, England. One third of the council was up for election and the Conservative Party stayed in overall control of the council.

After the election, the composition of the council was:
Conservative 38
Liberal Democrat 9
Labour 1

Election result

Ward results

References

2006 English local elections
2006
2000s in Kent